Eroni Vasiteri (born 27 May 1989) is a Fijian rugby union player. His usual position is as a centre, and he currently plays for Fijian Drua, having previously represented Connacht.

References

1989 births
Living people
Fijian rugby union players
Fiji international rugby union players
Rugby union centres
Fijian Drua players